Jingwan-dong is a dong, neighbourhood of Eunpyeong-gu in Seoul, South Korea.

Education
Schools located in Jingwan-dong:
 Jingwan Elementary School
 Eunjin Elementary School
 Seoul Eunvit Elementary School
 Bukhansan Elementary School
 Jingwan Middle School
 Sindo Middle School
 Hana Academy Seoul
 Jingwan High School
 Sindo High School

See also 
Administrative divisions of South Korea

References

External links
Eunpyeong-gu official website
 Eunpyeong-gu map at the Eunpyeong-gu official website
 Jingwan-dong resident office website

Neighbourhoods of Eunpyeong District